The Kaman K-17 was a two-seat experimental helicopter built by Kaman in the late 1950s. It used a cold-jet rotor system.

Specifications

References

1950s United States helicopters
K-225
1950s United States experimental aircraft
Aircraft first flown in 1958
Tipjet-powered helicopters